Inazuma Eleven is a Japanese anime television series that aired from 2008 to 2011 and is based on Level-5's video game series of the same name. The animated series was produced by OLM under the direction of Katsuhito Akiyama and consists of 127 episodes. In the second series, Endou and Raimon had to gather players from all over Japan to defeat the new enemies, Aliea Gakuen.

For episodes 27 to 54, the opening theme is "Maji de Kansha!". "Tsunagari-yo" is the opening theme for episodes 55 to 67. "Seishun Bus Guide" was the closing theme for episodes 27 to 50 while episodes 51 to 67 use the closing theme "Ryūsei Boy".

Episode list

References

Inazuma Eleven episode lists